Mudhdhoo, is an island  in the Baa Atoll in the Maldives.
It is the location of the Dusit Thani Maldives, a Dusit Thani Group resort hotel.

References

Islands of the Maldives